Ayotunde Adeyoola Phillips (born 26 July 1949) is a Nigerian Jurist and former Chief Judge of Lagos State.

Early life
Ayotunde Adeyoola Williams was born on 26 July 1949, in London, the first child of the late Justice James Oladipo Williams and Henrietta Aina Williams, a Lagos state-born judge. She attended primary school in London before returning to Nigeria with her sibling, Oluwafunmilayo Olajumoke Atilade. She obtained the West Africa School Certificate Examination at Queen's College, Lagos, and Ibadan Grammar School  before proceeding to the University of Lagos where she obtained a bachelor's degree in Law in June 1973.  She completed the compulsory one year Youth Service at Enugu State Ministry of Justice and was Call to the bar in 1974.

Law career
She started her career at Kehinde Sofola's Chambers in November 1975, a year after she was Call to the bar. She left the chamber in September 1976 to join the services of the Lagos State Development and Property Corporation as a legal Officer and rose to the position of legal adviser in 1990, the same year she got a transfer to the Ministry of Justice where she attained the rank of a High Court Judge in 1994.
In July 2012, she was appointed as the Chief Judge by Babatunde Fashola and after her retirement in June 2014, she was succeeded by Justice Oluwafunmilayo Olajumoke Atilade, her younger sister.

References

Judiciary of Lagos State
Living people
1968 births
People from London
Queen's College, Lagos alumni
University of Lagos alumni
British emigrants to Nigeria
Nigerian judges
Lagos State judges